The 1932–33 FAW Welsh Cup is the 52nd season of the annual knockout tournament for competitive football teams in Wales.

Key
League name pointed after clubs name.
B&DL - Birmingham & District League
FL D2 - Football League Second Division
FL D3N - Football League Third Division North
FL D3S - Football League Third Division South
MWL - Mid-Wales Football League
SFL - Southern Football League
WLN - Welsh League North
WLS D1 - Welsh League South Division One
W&DL - Wrexham & District Amateur League

First round

Second round
16 winners from the first round plus six new clubs.

Third round
Eleven winners form the second round plus 13 new clubs.

Fourth round
12 clubs from the third round plus two new clubs.

Fifth round
Six clubs from the fourth round. Merthyr Town get a bye to the Sixth round.

Sixth round
Three winners from the fifth round, Merthyr Town plus 12 new teams.

Seventh round

Semifinal
Replay were held at Chester.

Final
Final were held at Chester.

External links
The FAW Welsh Cup

1932-33
Wales
Cup